Sreevalsan J. Menon is an Indian Carnatic vocalist and a music composer from Kerala.

Biography

After initial training under Rajalakshmi Krishnan (disciple of Chembai Vaidyanatha Bhagavathar) and violinist T.V. Ramani at Thrissur, Menon had much of his advanced tutelage under the late Neyyattinkara Vasudevan. Menon is an 'A' grade artist of All India Radio and has given concerts all over the country including the National Concerts of AIR and Doordarshan. He has received several awards including Kerala Sangeetha Nataka Akademi Award 2013,  from the Madras Music Academy, and a title from Krishna Gana Sabha, also in Chennai, besides such institutions of repute in the Deccan. He has also participated in Music Transcends, a symphony held at Washington, D.C. in 2004, integrating Western and Indian classical music. His jugalbandis with Hindustani vocalist Ramesh Narayan and late Kathakali musicians Kalamandalam Sankaran Embranthiri and Kalamandalam Hyderali have been widely appreciated.

Menon's two songs ("I Be Here" and "I Have Secrets") and background score for Saint Dracula has been qualified for songs and original score categories of 85th Academy Awards.

The background score by Sreevalsan for the film Ottaal which won the crystal bear at the Berlin festival 2016 was praised for its laid back music in the award citation.

Known for the spiritual quality of his renditions, Sreevalsan's carnatic music style is marked by a majestic sweep in Krithi rendering, brevity in alapana, meaningful Niraval elaborations; all in sync with a perfect alignment to Sruthi.

Sreevalsan has also carved a niche area for himself through his thematic musical productions on the Rains, Seasons, Rasas and Temples of Kerala.

Personal life

Menon is married to Indu since 8 September 1996 and they have a daughter Subadra and a son Narayanan who are also known for their musical talent.

Career

Menon's music albums are fresh and innovative. They include Vanaprastham, a musical interpretation  of the  famous short story by M.T. Vasudevan Nair; Monsoon Anuraga a musical experience on monsoon rains. Vismaya, a fantasy video album featuring Artist Namboodiri, M T Vasudevan Nair and menon himself. He has given Carnatic vocal performances and lecture demonstrations throughout India, the Middle East, UK, US, Canada and Africa.

Menon works as Professor at the Kerala Agricultural University in Thrissur, and has a Ph D in Agricultural Extension from IARI, New Delhi. (He earned his doctorate with research on the social impact of rubber cultivation.) A native of Kunissery in Palakkad district, Menon lives in the temple town of Tripunithura off Kochi.

Filmography

Albums
Krishna - A Musical Reflection
Vanaprastham
Kshetranjali
Monsoon Anuraga
Classical Encounters - with guru Sri. Neyyatinkara Vasudevan
Vismaya - Emotional Expressions: audio & music video album with Bini Panicker
Manasa Smarami
Madhuram Gayati
Ananda Poonkatru
Sree Guruvayurappan Gananjali : Vol - 3
Jugal Bandi : Vol 1 & 2 - with Kalamandalam Shankaran Embranthiri & Meledam Narayanan
Sringaram
Begane Baro
Ramanan
Bhavayami
Navarasa Thillana
Irayimman Thampi Kritis
Rituleela
Hare
Swami Ayyappan
The genius of Kunjan Nambiar

References

External links
Sreevalsan J. Menon - Official website
75 Original Songs Tune Up For 2012 Oscar®
 Will Sreevalsan bring home an Oscar?
104 Original Scores in 2012 Oscar® Race
Video Interview - Carnatic musician, Vocalist - Sreevalsan J. Menon
The Hindu - Kunnakkudi Vaidyanathan and Sreevalsan J. Menon
Swathithirunal.org
The Hindu - AWESOME TRIO: Sreevalsan J. Menon, flanked by M.T. Vasudevan Nair, writer, and artist Namboodiri
Newindpress - When dusk settles...
 Video - Vismaya Music Album
 My Mother's Laptop - Music & Background Score 
The Hindu - A musical version of Changampuzha’s ‘Ramanan'
The Hindu - WELL composed!
Sreevalsan with Nithyasree Mahadevan
Remembering Mandolin U. Sreenivas (Malayalam)
Interview with Sreevalsan J Menon - Times of India
 
 Sreevalsan praises Action Hero Biju

Male Carnatic singers
Carnatic singers
21st-century Indian male classical singers
Living people
Year of birth missing (living people)
Films scored by Sreevalsan J. Menon
Singers from Kerala
Agriculture educators
People from Palakkad district
Recipients of the Kerala Sangeetha Nataka Akademi Award